Tessa Gobbo (born December 8, 1990) is an American rower. She attended Northfield Mount Hermon School in Massachusetts and Brown University. She won the gold medal in the eight at the 2015 World Rowing Championships and the 2016 Rio Olympics representing the United States.

References
 Tessa Gobbo at USRowing
 

1990 births
Living people
American female rowers
People from Keene, New Hampshire
World Rowing Championships medalists for the United States
Rowers at the 2016 Summer Olympics
Olympic gold medalists for the United States in rowing
Medalists at the 2016 Summer Olympics
Northfield Mount Hermon School alumni
Brown Bears rowers
21st-century American women